"I Would Stay" is a single released from Dutch group Krezip's second studio album, Nothing Less, released in 2000.

A sample from "I Would Stay" is used in the song "Bit a Bad Boy" from the Scooter album ''Under the Radar Over the Top,

SMD used a sample in their song "Just Like You", 
and Scott Brown used a sample in his song "Turn Up the Music"

Charts

Weekly charts

Year-end charts

Decade-end charts

References

2000 singles
Ultratop 50 Singles (Flanders) number-one singles
Dutch Top 40 number-one singles
2000 songs